Dharmaraj Cheralathan (born 21 April 1975) is an Indian Kabaddi player who currently represents Jaipur Pink Panthers in the VIVO Pro Kabaddi league. He was a member of the Indian Kabaddi team that won gold at the Kabaddi World Cup in 2016. Nicknamed “Anna”, Cheralathan led Patna Pirates to the Pro Kabaddi league in Season 4 and is one of the leading Super Tackle scorers in VIVO Pro Kabaddi history. He is capable of playing as both a right and left corner, Cheralathan has more than two decades of experience. The veteran defender is tactically sound and has consistently combined his experience and intelligence to outwit raiders.

Early life 
Cheralathan comes from a farming family in Tamil Nadu. He has one brother and two sisters. According to him, farming was all that was important to him while growing up. Even his brother is a farmer. They spent a lot of their young days working in the fields. Cheralathan's brother, D. Gopu, has also played in the Pro Kabaddi league and was a defender for Tamil Thalaivas in Season 6.

Career

Season 1 

Cheralathan played for Bengaluru Bulls in the inaugural season and scored 39 tackle points as well as 13 raid points. He had a tackle strike rate of 56.52% and was a nightmare for opposition raiders to deal with.

Season 2 

With 42 tackle points, Cheralathan led the Bengaluru Bulls defence in the second season. He also contributed in attack with 19 raid points. His tackle strike rate of 61.76% is impressive, but what stood out from this season was his success while raiding.

Season 3 

He was bought by Telugu Titans for the subsequent season and scored 31 tackle points for the side from Hyderabad. Despite a slight dip in his tackle success rate, Cheralathan still averaged a tackle strike rate of more than 50%.

Season 4 

Patna Pirates roped in Cheralathan ahead of the fourth season for Rs 29 lakh and appointed him as captain. He scored 39 tackle points and was rock-solid in defence as the Pirates made it back-to-back league titles. Cheralathan also topped the Super Tackles chart in the fourth season with 8 to his name.

Season 5 

He moved to Puneri Paltan for the following edition and only managed to score 25 tackle points with the Pune-based side. Cheralathan played 18 games for Pune but couldn't score more than 4 points in any of those contests.

Season 6 

After joining U Mumba in 2018, Cheralathan enjoyed a renaissance and scored an impressive 40 tackle points. He had a tackle strike rate of 57.97% and produced a defensive masterclass during U Mumba's win over Gujarat Fortunegiants in Delhi. Cheralathan's High 5 on the night against Season 6's finalists helped his side secure a victory.

International

A member of the Kabaddi Hall of Fame, Cheralathan holds nine gold medals from events such as the Kabaddi National Championship, the 2017 Southeast Asian Games and the Asian Beach Games.

Records and achievements
 VIVO Pro Kabaddi Champion (2016)
 2016 Kabaddi World Cup winner 
 Gold at 2017 Southeast Asian Games
 Gold at 2017 Asian Beach Games

References

1975 births
Indian kabaddi players
Kabaddi players from Tamil Nadu
Living people
Tamil sportspeople
Pro Kabaddi League players